Durvillaea fenestrata is a large, robust species of southern bull kelp endemic to the subantarctic Antipodes Islands of New Zealand.

Description
Durvillaea fenestrata has unbranched stipes, and many holes occur on the primary and secondary blades.

Distribution
Durvillaea fenestrata is endemic to the subantarctic Antipodes Islands of New Zealand.

References

External links

Fucales
Flora of New Zealand
Edible seaweeds
Protists described in 2019
Ochrophyte species